The Bespoke Gene Therapy Consortium (BGTC) is a research initiative of the US Foundation for the National Institutes of Health.  The consortium consists of the FDA, NIH, five non-profit organizations, and 10 pharmaceutical companies.

References

Research in the United States
Gene therapy
Consortia in the United States
Technology consortia
2021 establishments in the United States
Genetic engineering in the United States
Food and Drug Administration
National Institutes of Health